Greta Georgieva (born 19 April 1965) is a Bulgarian rowing coxswain. She competed in two events at the 1988 Summer Olympics.

References

1965 births
Living people
Bulgarian female rowers
Olympic rowers of Bulgaria
Rowers at the 1988 Summer Olympics
Place of birth missing (living people)
Coxswains (rowing)